Walter Wilkins (18 October 1809 – 28 May 1840) was a British politician.

The son of Walter Wilkins, an English MP, Wilkins lived in Maesllwch Castle and was educated at New College, Oxford.  He inherited part-ownership of Wilkins's Old Bank, in Brecon.  In 1831, he married Julia Cecilia Collinson, the future novelist. He was appointed as a magistrate for Radnorshire, and served as High Sheriff of Radnorshire in 1833.

Wilkins stood in the 1835 UK general election for the Whigs, and won the seat.  In 1839, he changed his name to Walter De Winton.  He died in 1840, while still in office.

References

1809 births
1840 deaths
Alumni of New College, Oxford
High Sheriffs of Radnorshire
People from Radnorshire
UK MPs 1835–1837
UK MPs 1837–1841
Whig (British political party) MPs for Welsh constituencies